The 1959–60 Northern Football League season was the 62nd in the history of the Northern Football League, a football competition in Northern England.

Clubs

The league featured 15 clubs which competed in the last season, no new clubs joined the league this season.

League table

References

1959-60
5